My Story for You (Chinese: 为了你我愿意热爱整个世界) is a 2018 Chinese television series based on Tangjia Sanshao (唐家三少)'s novel of the same name; starring Luo Jin and Zheng Shuang. The story is based on the author's real-life story on his struggles and hardships before he became a famous novelist, as well as his romance with his wife. The series premiered on June 18, 2018 via iQiyi.

The series received positive reviews for its heart-warming and relatable story.

Synopsis
In 1998, Zhang Changgong gets his first taste of success as a developer in an IT company. At the same time, he meets and falls in love with Li Muzi, a kind and intelligent university student. Unfortunately the IT industry soon faces an economic crisis, and Zhang Changgong is left unemployed. With the help of his friends and family, Changgong faces the challenges head on, and eventually becomes a top-selling author.

To court her, he wrote 137 love letters in a year, exceeding 1 million Chinese characters. To guard her, he created 16 novels with more than 40 million words, working a wonder of internet literature. This is the love story that unfolded for 16 years already between Tang Jian Shao and his wife. ~ Novel Summary

Cast

Main

Supporting

People around Zhang Changgong

People around Li Muzi

Others

Soundtrack

Production 
The series is directed by Yu Cuihua (Love O2O, Eternal Love), written by Mobao Feibao (Scarlet Heart, My Sunshine) and produced by  Xiong Xiaoling (Love O2O, My Sunshine). Other notable cast members include Teng Huatao (Dwelling Narrowness, Fu Chen) as its executive producer and Di Kun (To Be a Better Man) as its artistic director.

Tangjia Sanshao, the original author of the novel, acts as the promotional ambassador of the series. This is the first cross-over collaboration between entertainment media (television) and literary work.

The series was filmed in Shanghai, Beijing and New York from April to August 2017.

Awards and nominations

References

Chinese romance television series
Television shows based on Chinese novels
2018 Chinese television series debuts
Television series by Croton Media
IQIYI original programming
Chinese web series
2018 Chinese television series endings
2018 web series debuts